Divide may refer to:

Mathematics
 Division (mathematics)
Divides, redirects to Divisor

Geography
 Drainage divide, a line separating two drainage basins
 Great Divide Basin, in Wyoming

Places
 Divide, Saskatchewan, Canada
 Divide, Colorado,  community
 Divide, Illinois, an unincorporated community
 Divide, Montana, a rural community
 Divide, Oregon, an unincorporated community
 Divide, West Virginia, an unincorporated community
 Divide County, North Dakota

Music
 "Divide", a song by All That Remains from The Order of Things
 "Divide", a song by Disturbed from Indestructible
 "Divide", a song by Vision of Disorder from Vision of Disorder
÷ (album), a 2017 album by Ed Sheeran
Divides, album by The Virginmarys 2016
 The Continental Divide (album)
The Divide, album by Tom Waits and Scott Vestal 2011

See also
 Continental divide (disambiguation)
 Div (disambiguation)
 Divided (disambiguation)
 Division (disambiguation)
 Division sign (÷)
 The Divide (disambiguation)
 Vertical line (dividing line)